Albee is a surname, notably of Edward Albee (Edward Franklin Albee III, 1928–2016), an American playwright. 

Other notable people with the surname include:

Becca Albee, American musician and visual artist 
Earle Albee (1898–1963), American politician
Edward Albee (1928-2018), American playwright
Edward Franklin Albee II (1857–1930), American showman
Fred H. Albee (1876–1945), American surgeon 
George Albee (1921–2006), American clinical psychologist
George E. Albee (1845–1918), United States Army officer
Grace Albee (1890–1985), American printmaker and wood engraver
Josh Albee (born 1959), American actor
Persis Foster Eames Albee (1836–1914), American businessperson and entrepreneur
Reed A. Albee (1885–1961), American businessman
H. Russell Albee (1867–1950), mayor of Portland, Oregon, U.S.
Spencer Albee (born 1976), American musician
Wayne Albee (1882–1937), American pictorialist photographer